The Roman Catholic Archdiocese of La Plata (erected 15 February 1897, as the Diocese of La Plata) is in Argentina and is a metropolitan diocese and its suffragan sees are Azul, Chascomús, and Mar del Plata. It was elevated on 20 April 1934.

Bishops

Ordinaries
Mariano Antonio Espinosa (1898–1900), appointed Archbishop of Buenos Aires
Juan Nepomuceno Terrero y Escalada (1900–1921)
Francisco Alberti (1921–1938)
Juan Pascual Chimento (1938–1946)
Tomás Juan Carlos Solari (1948–1954)
Antonio José Plaza (1955–1985)
Antonio Quarracino (1985–1990), appointed Archbishop of Buenos Aires (Cardinal in 1991)
Carlos Walter Galán Barry (1991–2000)
Héctor Rubén Aguer (2000–2018)
Víctor Manuel Fernández (2018–Present)

Coadjutor archbishop
Héctor Rubén Aguer (1998–2000)

Auxiliary bishops
Francisco Alberti (1899–1917), appointed Bishop here
Santiago Luis Copello (1918–1928), appointed Auxiliary Bishop of Buenos Aires; future Cardinal
Juan Pascual Chimento (1928–1934), appointed Bishop of Mercedes (later returned here as Archbishop)
Anunciado Serafini (1935–1939), appointed Bishop of Mercedes
Germiniano Esorto (1943–1946), appointed Bishop of Bahía Blanca
Enrique Rau (1951–1954), appointed Bishop of Resistencia
Raúl Francisco Primatesta (1957–1961), appointed Bishop of San Rafael; future Cardinal
Eduardo Francisco Pironio (1964–1972), appointed Bishop of Mar del Plata; future Cardinal
Octavio Nicolás Derisi (1970–1984)
Mario Picchi, S.D.B. (1975–1978), appointed Bishop of Venado Tuerto
José María Montes (1978–1983), appointed Bishop of Chascomús
Guillermo José Garlatti (1994–1997), appointed Bishop of San Rafael
Antonio Marino (2003–2011), appointed Bishop of Mar del Plata
Nicolás Baisi (2010–2020), appointed Bishop of Puerto Iguazú
Alberto Germán Bochatey Chaneton, O.S.A. (2012–
Jorge Esteban González (2020–

Other priests of this diocese who became bishops
Miguel d’Andrea, appointed Auxiliary Bishop of Buenos Aires in 1919
Alejandro Schell (priest here, 1922–1957), appointed Coadjutor Bishop of Lomas de Zamora in 1958

Bishops currently serving in this Archdiocese
They also appear as part of the above Bishops section.
Archbishop: Víctor Manuel Fernández
Auxiliary Bishop: Alberto Germán Bochatey Chaneton, O.S.A.
Auxiliary Bishop: Jorge Esteban González

Territorial losses

References

External links and references

Arzobispado de La Plata official site

Roman Catholic dioceses in Argentina
Roman Catholic Ecclesiastical Province of La Plata
Religious organizations established in 1897
Roman Catholic dioceses and prelatures established in the 19th century